Reginald Reeves (6 August 1923 – 1 September 1992) was a speedway rider from England.

Speedway career 
Reeves rode in the top two tiers of British Speedway from 1949 to 1965, riding for various clubs. In 1960 and 1961, he returned the leading average in the Provincial League, when riding for the Rayleigh Rockets. Also in 1961, he won the Provincial Riders' Championship.

Family
His son Eddie Reeves was also a speedway rider.

References 

1923 births
1992 deaths
British speedway riders
Hackney Hawks riders
Ipswich Witches riders
New Cross Rangers riders
Rayleigh Rockets riders
Walthamstow Wolves riders
West Ham Hammers riders
Yarmouth Bloaters riders